Hospital volunteers, also known as candy stripers in the United States, work without regular pay in a variety of health care settings, usually under the direct supervision of nurses.

The term candy striper is derived from the red-and-white striped pinafores that female volunteers traditionally wore, which are culturally reminiscent of candy canes. The term and its associated uniform are less frequently used in current clinical settings.

Another hospital volunteer organization sponsored by the American Red Cross, was the "Blue Teens" who wore blue-and-white striped pinafores.  The female adult volunteers of this organization were known as "Grey Ladies" and wore light grey uniforms.

In the United States, volunteers' services are of considerable importance to individual patients as well as the health care system in general.  Some people volunteer during high school or college (and more rarely at the middle school level), out of curiosity about health-care professions, an interest in learning to be of service in a community volunteer organization, or in order to satisfy community service requirements as required by some schools. Additionally, other people choose to volunteer at later stages in their life, particularly after retirement.

History
Candy Stripers originated as a high-school civics class project in East Orange, New Jersey, in 1944. The uniforms were sewn by the girls in the class from material provided by the teacher – a red-and-white-striped fabric known as "candy stripe". The students chose East Orange General Hospital as the home for their class project.

Red Cross pins and patches were also worn on the uniforms indicating completion of required Red Cross training.

Usually a hospital sponsored either Candy Striper or Blue Teen volunteers but not both.

Duties
Duties of hospital volunteers vary widely depending upon the facility.  Volunteers may work in staff reception areas and gift shops; file and retrieve documents and mails; take out trash; clean; provide administrative backup; assist with research by following strict sterilizing procedures for laboratory glass and plasticware, known as autoclaving; help visitors; visit with patients; or transport various small items like flowers, medical records, lab specimens, and drugs from unit to unit. Other volunteer tasks include running a music or art therapy program, where volunteers draw or play an instrument for the patients. Some hospitals even utilize volunteers to cuddle newborn babies.

A few hospitals ask their volunteers to help out with janitorial duties, such as stripping and remaking beds with clean linens.  Other "advanced volunteers" include patient-care liaisons and volunteer orderlies.  These volunteers must operate on the orders of a nurse or a physician and are given special training to permit them to work with patients. They are also more common in large hospitals, particularly university-affiliated hospitals and teaching hospitals, as they allow pre-medical students to gain experience in patient care by taking pressure off a busy care team.

Some hospitals manage their volunteers from a dispersal unit and assign them to tasks based on real-time labor demands, while other hospitals assign volunteers to a single unit for the duration of their service. Female volunteers traditionally wore pink-and-white jumpers, while male volunteers traditionally wore light-blue tunics or shirts over dark slacks. Today, male and female volunteers often wear a uniform shirt, polo shirt or some other short-sleeved shirt with slacks. Some volunteers (particularly "advanced volunteers") will wear scrubs, but this is usually avoided so volunteers are not confused with medical personnel. All volunteers wear ID tags within the hospital that prominently indicate the volunteer's status and position.

See also
Medical volunteerism

References

External links
 StoryCorps Interview - Oral History 
 Volunteer Management Professionals of Canada
 Association for Healthcare Volunteer Resource Professionals (AHVRP)

Volunteer
Medical volunteerism
Hospital staff